The inauguration of the president of Nigeria is a ceremony to mark the commencement of a new four-year term of the president of Nigeria. During this ceremony, some 90 to 95 days after the presidential election, the president takes the presidential oath of office. The inauguration takes place for each new presidential term, even if the president is continuing in office for a second term.

The first inauguration of Shehu Shagari took place on 1 October 1979 the independence day of Nigeria. Since the beginning of the fourth republic in 1999, all inaugurations have been held on 29 May. The most recent presidential inauguration was held on 29 May 2019, when Muhammadu Buhari resumed his second term in office.

Recitation of the presidential oath of office is the only component in this ceremony mandated by the Nigerian Constitution. The chief justice typically administers the presidential oath of office. Since 1999, the oath has been administered at six scheduled public inaugurations, by five chief justices.

The ceremony has been held at the Eagle Square, Abuja, the main square of the capital city since the beginning of the fourth republic.

Oath of office
The Constitution of Nigeria specifies an oath of office for the president of the federation.  The oath is administered by the chief justice of the Supreme Court of Nigeria or the person for the time being appointed to exercise the functions of that office:

List of inauguration ceremonies
The 8 inauguration ceremonies marking the start of a new four-year presidential term of office and also the one marking the start of a partial presidential term following the intra-term death of the incumbent president are listed in the table below.

Notes

References

Presidential inaugurations
Politics of Nigeria